Jinx is a platform video game developed by HammerHead and published by Sony Computer Entertainment Europe exclusively for PlayStation.

Gameplay
The game consists of six different themed realms, each of which has three levels. Before reaching the final level of the game, players will travel through the candy-colored castle of Mamoo City, the waterlogged rainforests of Zonimama, the sand dunes and mock-Egyptian architecture of Pyramidicia, the underwater realm of Aquaquatica, the garish Spookyland, and the pirates' hometown of Buccaneria--all of which will be inhabited by different enemies.

Plot
The titular character in the game is a failed magician who, as the son of an incredibly powerful wizard, has somewhat embarrassingly ended up working as a court jester for King Mamooset XIV. The plot of the game sees Jinx awakening one morning to find that his world has quite literally gone mad. A group of pirates led by the evil Captain Gripply has attacked the world of Ploog using a magical spell that's turned the inhabitants of Jinx's world against one another.

Development
The game was announced in 2002.

Reception

Eurogamer rated the game a 4 of 10 stating "Overall, you'll play worse games than Jinx - it does what it sets out to do; i.e. be a safe, neat, no frills platformer, that is suitable for children. But then there are dozens of better games in the genre on the PSone, and most of them will be available at a fraction of the price. Avoid."

References

External links 
 

2003 video games
3D platform games
Europe-exclusive video games
Fictional jesters
PlayStation (console) games
PlayStation (console)-only games
Single-player video games
Sony Interactive Entertainment games
Video games developed in the United Kingdom